Continuum is the second studio album by American progressive metal band Prototype. The album was released on May 23, 2006 via Nightmare Records. The opening track on the album, "The Way It Ends", was featured as a bonus track in the music rhythm game Guitar Hero III: Legends of Rock and as part of the Rock Band Network's downloadable content.

Track listing

Personnel
Credits are adapted from the album's liner notes.

Prototype
 Vince Levalois – vocals, guitar, engineering
 Kragen Lum – guitar, backing vocals on "Probe", additional engineering
 Kirk Scherer – bass

Additional musicians
 Damion Ramirez – drums on tracks 1–9, 11
 Pat Magrath – drums on "Heart Machine"

Production
 Prototype – producers
 Neil Citron – engineering
 Neil Kernon – mixing
 Eddy Schreyer – mastering

Artwork
 Travis Smith – artwork, package design and layout (with band)
 Alex Solca – band photography

References

External links
 

2006 albums
Prototype (band) albums